A BWB Holster or Below WaistBand Holster is a type of handgun holster worn inside the waistband of the wearers pants and rests below the belt line.  A BWB holster offers deeper concealment when compared to the traditional IWB (Inside WaistBand) holster, which results in more noticeable comfort.  Because a BWB Holster is worn inside the pants and below the belt it is often the most concealed type of holster available that works with most clothing options.

Advantages and Disadvantages

The primary benefit of a BWB holster is deep concealment ensuring the firearm is securely and discreetly concealed at all times.  Many types of IWB, OWB (Outside WaistBand) and SOB (Small Of Back) holsters can expose the firearm when the shirt becomes lodged between or if the wearers top is too short or snug; with a BWB this is not an issue because the firearm is completely concealed within the pants, shorts, slacks or skirt.

Another benefit of the BWB holster it that it is designed to flow naturally with the body creating flexibility at the pivot points resulting in easy wearability and all day comfort.  Holsters that are worn at the waistband and belt, or sometimes even around the shoulders, can often restrict movement causing pinching or rubbing of the skin and general discomfort.

When carrying a firearm retention ability is always a consideration and the BWB holster excels in this area as well.  Due to its deep concealment the BWB holster is less likely to be accessed by another person.  The caveat to this is that the BWB holsters higher level of retention and deep concealment can cause the firearm to be more difficult to retrieve, especially while seated, putting it at a slight disadvantage.  Most often choosing the correct size BWB holster for the firearm can often help overcome this issue and commonly leaning back with a BWB holster gains better access to the firearm from a seated position.

Materials

Options for a BWB holster materials vary with leather and denim being the two most common found.  Leather and denim are both breathable and attractive in appearance.  While denim is often less expensive, leather is more durable and can be dyed in many colors; leather will also take the form of the firearm and a quality leather is thick enough to provide protection from perspiration and other elements.

Common Types and Styles

Holster designs for firearms cover a wide variety of shapes, sizes, and materials. Holsters are generally designed to offer protection to the firearm, secure retention, and provide access to it.  The most popular options of BWB holsters resemble fanny packs or a pouch type of concealment for the firearm.  As an added safety feature a few of the BWB holsters ensure the trigger is inaccessible in the holster until the firearm is drawn.  Concealment holsters are designed to easily conceal sub-compact and compact firearms while a few even offer options for full-sized firearms.  Because BWB Holsters are designed to be worn below the waistband, under clothing and held close to the body, comfort is important.

See also
Handgun holster
Paddle holster

References

Handgun holsters